Central Cordillera refers to the New Guinea Highlands.

Cordillera Central, meaning central range in Spanish, may refer to the following mountain ranges:

 Cordillera Central, Andes (disambiguation), several mountain ranges in South America
 Cordillera Blanca, Peru
 Cordillera Central, Bolivia
 Cordillera Central, Colombia
 Cordillera Central, Ecuador
 Cordillera Central, Peru
 Cordillera Central, Costa Rica
 Cordillera Central, Dominican Republic on the island of Hispaniola
 Cordillera Central, Luzon in the Philippines
 Cordillera Central, Puerto Rico
 Cordillera Central, Spain

See also
 Central Range (disambiguation)
 Cordillera Occidental (disambiguation)
 Cordillera Oriental (disambiguation)